Leninsk may refer to several places:
Leninsk, Russia, name of several inhabited localities in Russia
Leninsk, former name of the town of Asaka, Uzbekistan
Leninsk, name of Baikonur, Kazakhstan, in 1958–1995
Leninsk-Kuznetsky (city), a city in Kemerovo Oblast, Russia

Vladimir Lenin